Sakoli Municipal Council is a Class-3 municipal local body administrating Sakoli City in Bhandara district of Maharashtra, India. Arjuni Municipal Council

History
Sakoli constituted as Municipal Council in 2016 by amalgamation of areas under Sakoli and Sendurwafa village councils.

Municipal Council Election

Electoral performance 2016

Municipal councils in Maharashtra
Bhandara district